This is a list of Japanese Army Military Engineer Vehicles during World War II. Included are diverse types of Armored lumberjacks, mine clearing vehicles, engineering vehicles, recovery cranes and other materiel used by Imperial Japanese Army Engineer units during World War II.

Engineer vehicles
 

Sōkō Sagyō Ki (SS-Ki)- multi-functional armored engineering support vehicle
SS Kou Gata
SS Otsu Gata
SS Hei Gata
SS Tei Gata
SS Bo Gata (Armored Bridge Layer)
Armored Recovery Vehicle "Se-Ri"
Armored Lumberjack "Ho-K"
Lumber Sweeper "Basso-Ki"
F B swamp vehicle
T B swamp scout vehicle
Type T-G "bridge layer"
Type 97 "Chi-Yu" mine flail tank
Type 97 "mine clearing tank GS"
Type 97 "Pole planter" and Type 97 "Cable layer"
Type 94 Repair vehicle
Type 95 Crane vehicle "Ri-Ki"
Type 95 Collapsible boat
Type 97 Mini Engineer vehicle "Yi-Go" a/k/a Type 98 "Ya-I Go"
Snowmobile "Yu-Ki" 
Amphibious Engineer vehicle "Na-Mi" 
Type 94 mobile workshop
Type 4 Work vehicle - designed for airfield construction, used the Type 2 light tank chassis
Experimental Excavator
Experimental Crawler truck
Small remote controlled demolition vehicle
Type 99 Pontoon bridge

Army engineer units
2nd Tank Division Engineer Unit
27th Independent Engineer Regiment 
12th Independent Engineer Regiment 
5th Independent Engineer Regiment
6th Div AIF (Airfield Engineers)
Airfield Construction Group No.5
Oil field Construction Group No.2
1st company of the 26th Independent Engineer Regiment
2nd Independent Engineer Company 
80th Independent Radio Platoon
2nd unit from the Oil well drilling Section of the 21st Field Ordnance Depot
1st Field Well Drilling Company
2nd Field Well Drilling Company
3rd Field Well Drilling Company
4th Field Well Drilling Company
48th Anchorage Headquarters
118th Land Duty Company
1st from the 11th Water Supply and Purification Unit
one platoon of the 12th Engineer Regiment

References
History of War.org
Taki's Imperial Japanese Army Page - Akira Takizawa

Military engineer vehicles
Japanese Army military engineer vehicles of World War II
World War II, military engineer vehicles
World War II, military engineer vehicles